Cecilia Renata of Austria (16 July 1611 – 24 March 1644) was Queen of Poland as the wife of King Władysław IV Vasa.

Selection and coronation
Cecilia Renata was a daughter of Holy Roman Emperor Ferdinand II, of the House of Habsburg, and Maria Anna of Bavaria.
Born in 1611 in Graz, she was chosen as bride by the Polish nobility. She married Władysław on 9 August in Vienna by proxy, and then in Warsaw in person on 12 September 1637, and the same day was crowned at St. John's Cathedral. This was the first royal coronation outside of Kraków, the historic, former capital of Poland, and this greatly angered the Polish nobility. A law was instigated to reserve coronations to Kraków in 1638.

Queenship
Young and energetic, Queen Cecilia Renata soon began organising the royal court to her liking. She was popular, especially for her politeness.  One noble wrote in his memoirs that she insisted other women sit with her, even though she was queen. Cecilia Renata could not remove her husband's mistress, Hedwig Łuszkowska, by herself, so she arranged a marriage between Hedwig and Starosta Merecki, John Wypyski. In 1638, Cecilia Renata and Władysław visited Vienna.

Cecilia Renata advocated the Habsburg and pro-Catholic point of view and allied herself with the pro-Habsburg faction of chancellor Jerzy Ossoliński and pro-Catholic Albrycht Stanisław Radziwiłł. Her political opponent at the court was the faction of Adam Kazanowski, whose influence over King Władysław, his childhood friend, diminished after her marriage. Kazanowski was allied with Chancellor Piotr Gembicki, who thus became one of her opponents.
Her influence was strong for the first 2–3 years of marriage, and she had much to say about the royal nominations for important official positions. After 1638/1639 when Władysław realised that Habsburgs were prepared to give him little assistance, her power waned, and he started to disregard her advice.

Cecilia Renata kept in contact with her brothers and continued an intimate attachment with them; she also became friends with her sister-in-law Anna Catherine. She enjoyed music, concerts, theatre performances and this may have greatly influenced her husband, who was one of the founders of Polish national theatre and brought many famous and well-known artists and performers from all around Europe to the country.

Pregnancies and death
During her marriage she became pregnant three times:

 Sigismund Casimir (1 April 1640 – 9 August 1647)
 Maria Anna Isabella (8 January 1642 – 7 February 1642)
 Stillborn daughter (23 March 1644)

Cecilia Renata died the next day as a consequence of an infection, likely related to the childbirth. Following her sudden death, Cecilia Renata was deeply mourned by both Władysław and the Royal Polish court. She also left a good impression on the public, mostly for her piety and good will.

See also
 Kazimierzowski Palace

References

External links 

 Discussion of the portrait, in Polish It is unknown whether this picture presents Cecylia Renata or Gryzelda Konstancja z Zamoyskich Wiśniowiecka, as the historical sources are indecisive.
 The Significance of the Crown Portrait of King Sigismund II Augustus by Peter Danckerts de Rij

Polish queens consort
Grand Duchesses of Lithuania
Prussian royal consorts
17th-century House of Habsburg
House of Vasa
Austrian princesses
Burials at Wawel Cathedral
1611 births
1644 deaths
Polish Roman Catholics
Deaths in childbirth
Daughters of emperors
Daughters of kings